Nyalas is a small mukim and town in Jasin District, Malacca, Malaysia. It is located at the state's northeastern corner, bordering the Tampin District in Negeri Sembilan.

Economy 
The economic drive for Nyalas is agricultural products and commodities, such as pomelo, rubber and palm oil.

Tourist attractions
 Bukit Batu Lebah Recreational Forest - The recreational forest located near the town.

Notable people
People who were born in, residents of, or otherwise closely associated with Nyalas include:
Ahmad Bin Sulong. Also known as Mat Kelang, a Silat practitioner from Nyalas.
Zainon Munshi Sulaiman. Also known as Ibu Zain, a teacher and earliest woman politician from UMNO.
See Kok Luen. A young Football player for Melaka United.

See also
 Jasin District

References

Mukims of Malacca
Jasin District